|}

The Princess Elizabeth Stakes is a Group 3 flat horse race in Great Britain open to fillies and mares aged three years or older. It is run at Epsom Downs over a distance of 1 mile and 113 yards (1,713 metres), and it is scheduled to take place each year in early June.

History
An event called the Princess Elizabeth Stakes used to be contested at Epsom in April. It was restricted to three-year-old fillies, and it served as a trial for the Oaks. For a period it held Group 3 status, but it was subsequently downgraded to Listed level. It was switched to Kempton Park in 1991, and it was discontinued in 1992. Winners of this race included Rockfel, Carrozza, Homeward Bound and Rafha.

The present version has developed from the Victress Stakes, a Listed race established in 1995. It was renamed the Princess Elizabeth Stakes in 2001, and it was promoted to Group 3 level in 2004.

The race is now held on the second day of Epsom's two-day Derby Festival meeting, the same day as the Epsom Derby.

Records
Most successful horse (2 wins):
 Echelon – 2006, 2007
 Antara – 2010, 2011
 Thistle Bird - 2013, 2014

Leading jockey (6 wins):
 Frankie Dettori – Fairy Queen (1999), Gonfilia (2004), Sundrop (2005), Antara (2010, 2011), Wilamina (2018)

Leading trainer (5 wins):
 Saeed bin Suroor – Fairy Queen (1999), Gonfilia (2004), Sundrop (2005), Antara (2010, 2011)

Winners

See also
 Horse racing in Great Britain
 List of British flat horse races

References
 Racing Post:
 , 

 galopp-sieger.de – Princess Elizabeth Stakes.
 ifhaonline.org – International Federation of Horseracing Authorities – Princess Elizabeth Stakes (2019).
 pedigreequery.com – Princess Elizabeth Stakes – Epsom.

Flat races in Great Britain
Epsom Downs Racecourse
Mile category horse races for fillies and mares